Payatas is an administrative division in eastern Metro Manila, the Philippines. It is an urban barangay located in the 2nd district of Quezon City adjacent to the barangays of Commonwealth, Batasan Hills and Bagong Silangan.

History
The name Payatas derived from the word payat sa taas, which refers to the soil located in the upper part of Tullahan River as unsuitable for planting rice.

On July 4, 1974 – In pursuance of P. D. 86 as amended by P. D. 86-A, portion of the community known as ZONE 108 – Commonwealth located at Quezon City, which is not a Barrio but having sufficient population and definite territorial jurisdiction organized itself into a Barangay known as Barangay No. 8 and elected its official during the Organizational meeting who took their oath before Hon. Eduardo Soliman Jr.

On September 21, 1974, Presidential Decree 557 was promulgated, declaring among others that in case of the city of Manila and other chartered cities where there are no Barrios, all existing Barangay therein created under P. D. 86 as amended by P. D. 86-A shall continued as such Barangays and adopted Republic Act 3590, the revised Barrio Charter as Barangay charter.

On June 22, 1975, Resolution No. 75-12 was passed by Barangay Zone 108 consolidating or merging all barangays within Commonwealth area including that of Barangay No. 8 (Payatas) resulting in the abolition of the corporate existence and personality of the latter which has been declared as null and void in a decision made by Judge Augusto L. Valencia dated March 5, 1976 in civil Case No. Q-20735 for declaratory judgement.

On May 30, 1976, Barangay Captain Inocencio Deyro of Barangay Commonwealth, constituted under Resolution No. 75-12 which was already null and void called a meeting to take place on June 6, 1976 at 6:00 PM and among the listed Agenda is the appointment of Purok Leaders in Barangay No. 8 (Payatas) thereby seeking to perform an Act affecting Barangay No. 8 (Payatas) which is not only an open defiance of the clarification order of the Hon. Judge Augusto L. Valencia that also without jurisdiction and October 14, 1976 Judge Jaime R. Agloro rendered his decision in Special Civil Case No. Q-21577 – prohibiting that respondents (Barangay Captain Inocencio Deyro and Barangay Commonwealth) interfering in any manner with the powers, duties and functions of Barangay No. 8 (Payatas) Commonwealth, Quezon City.

Barangay No. 8, now called Payatas, has been created with definite territorial jurisdiction as confirmed by Judge Augusto L. Valencia in his order dated March 5, 1976 and on October 14, 1976, Judge Jaime R. Agloro rendered his decision in a Special Civic Case No. Q-21577 – which prohibits any interference in any manner with the powers, duties and functions of Barangay No. 8 now known as Barangay Payatas. Because of this, Payatas is the only barangay so far that was created through judicial process.

Demography
As of 2015, the age-sex distribution of the population showed that children aged 5 to 9 years were the largest age group, making up 11.0 percent of the household population. This was followed by those in the age groups 15 to 19 years (10.7 percent), then 0 to 4 years and 10 to 14 years (both at 10.6 percent).
 
Males outnumbered females in the age group 0 to 54 years. Females, on the other hand, outnumbered their male counterparts in the older age group 55 years old and over.

Community
The population of Barangay Payatas was almost 130,333 in 2015. Most of the residents fall below the poverty level, living under harsh and poor conditions in the depressed areas. Payatas has the fastest growing population in the city; its residents are of various ethnic groups, with multifaceted socio-cultural orientation, mostly from the Northern Luzon. They are Ilokanos, Panggalatoks, Novo Ecijanos, Tagalogs, Kapampangan and a small percentage of Ibanags, Itawis and members of Igorot tribes. There are also migrants from Southern-Tagalog Part – Bicolanos, Visayas, Mindanao Region and a little percentage of Muslims in the Community.

The language used is Tagalog, English is widely spoken, Waray, Ilonggo, Visaya, Bicol, Ilokano, Panggalatoks, Kapampangan were secondary languages commonly used.

Christianity is dominant, most of these Christians are Roman Catholics, there are also a small member of Muslims, some are Iglesia ni Cristo, Protestants (El Shaddai, Shalom, Born Again, Mormons, Seventh Day Adventist, etc.) and Aglipays.

Most residents lives in semi-concrete homes, those living near dumpsite augments n whatever materials they could recycle for their houses/shanties.

While a big portion of the area has been developed into residential subdivisions (Don Carlos Heights, Manila Remnants, Doña Nicasia, Empire Subdivision, Capitol Homes II, Amlac Ville Subd., Violago Homes Parkwood Subd., Madrigal Subd., Manahan Subd., Fil-Invest II Mountain View, Villa Gracia Homes, etc.) Vast areas of land remain either under developed or undeveloped because of poor access and lack of services and facilities. Many of those areas have evolved into squatter colonies. The area can contain a national mixture of housing sites commercial and business centers, light industries, civic centers, educational areas and recreational parks.

Transportation

Public utility vehicles
Jeepneys serve as public transport at the northern areas via Gravel Pit Road plying either Lupang Pangako or Montalban. Approximately 60 units more or less ply these routes. Fare varies depending on distance. There is only one existing jeepney Operators and Drivers Association, which is Lupang Pangako JODA office address is at Urban Lupang Pangako, Payatas B, Q. C.

Tricycles services all other parts of Payatas there are four registered Tricycle Operators and Drivers Association, with almost 1,000.00 units operating from Area A, Area B and Urban Lupang Pangako. These are the following:

Payatas Tricycle Operators and Driver's Association (PATODA)
Litex Payatas Tricycle Operator & Drivers Association (LIPATODA)
Violago Homes Parkwood Tricycle Operators & Drivers Association (PARKTODA)
Urban Poor Transportation Services Organization (LPUPPTODA)

In different communities, those who are residing at subdivision residents use their own private vehicles.

Roads
Payatas Road is basically the service road for the NGC area but it also serves as the main access road to properties situated in the central areas such as Ilang-Ilang Street to Campsite, Sampaguita Street going to Brgy. Bagong Silangan, Everlasting Street going to Lower Hasmin.

Gravel Pit Road is originally part of the peripheral road of La Mesa Reservoir but now serves as the sole public road of Northern Payatas Area.

Proposed C-6 is a metro toll way facility that is expected to traverse the area but is still under study as to its alignment by the PNCC as BOT Project of the DOTC.

Collector roads branch out from the primary roads extending the network into the inner areas, these are mostly Barangay main roads like the following.

 Ilang-Ilang Streets linking to San Juan Bautista Street and Spiritual road at Campsite Area. 
 Sampaguita Street going to Springfield area and part of San Vicente Street also at Campsite.
 Everlasting Street to Hasmin Street, Lower Hasmin Street going to gravel Pit Road, Payatas B.
 Molave street connecting at Litex Road, going to Lower Molave, Tahanan Rehabilitation, Atis Roads going to Spiritual and San Juan Bautista Street at Campsite.
 Madja-as Avenue going into inner Group 2 composing of Mayon, Banahaw Campo Verde Street etc.
 Amlac Ville Subdivision private road, the main road going to Urban Lupang Pangako, including Phase 1, II, III and Phase IV, Payatas B.

The improvement and repairs of access road is the main factor that provides utility services such as electric power, water, public transport and communication in the area.

Drainage and sewage
Payatas is drained principally by the Marikina River Basin with the Marikina River as the main Drainage Out fall.

Developed areas such as residential subdivisions have their own drainage network or man-made canals or pipe grids discharging into rivers and creeks.

Toilet facilities and individual septic tanks are mostly found in developed housing areas. In Area A, Payatas residents mostly- employ, water scaled types of toilet facility. In Lupang Pangako, and some at Area B, Payatas, 80% of the residents utilize open dumping practices for waste disposal.

There is no area wide sewer system for Payatas. Waste water coming from squatter colonies is usually directly and indiscriminately discharged on the ground surface.

Solid waste disposal

The Payatas Dumpsite is situated in the Northern part of the area some three kilometers from Commonwealth via Litex Road. It occupies more than 13 hectares of entirely private properties. An estimated 2,000 cubic meters (924 tons) of garbage is being dumped in Payatas daily municipalities dumping in the area are Quezon City, and San Juan.

There are approximately 2,000 scavengers and 50 junk shop owners who benefit from the presence of the dump site in the area.

Residents dispose their waste/garbage through the Xerox waste management program of the Barangay Government (Garbage Collection).

Payatas dumpsite 

 
Payatas is known for its former dumpsite which was closed in 2010. A landslide in the area caused the national legislation which banned open ground dump sites in the Philippines. A more regulated dumping ground was established adjacent to the old landfill in 2011, but the site was also closed in 2017. 

As of 2023, the dumpsite has since been converted into an urban park for cycling activities.

Water supply

Approximately 95% of the area is served by MWSI or (Maynilad). This consists primarily of the residential areas immediately near the IBP Road, Ilang-Ilang St., Payatas A. (Presently MWSI were continuously out-laying the main line (pipes) for the whole area of Payatas, by the end of the year 2000 it is expected that all areas of Payatas will avail the MWSI service).

Water requirements of those residing in the remaining 10% are serviced by both public and private artesian wells, open pit wells, spring creeks and water peddlers.

Water rationing is undertaken by the City Government on a daily basis within the areas of Lupang Pangako (Phase I, II, III and IV) where most of Urban poor population (approximately 5,000 families) is situated. This is done under SMILE Project: “OPLAN Paglilingap sa Payatas” under the Office of the Mayor.

Other sources of drinking water include private artesian wells and water peddlers. Water is bought at P 1.00 per gallon container.

Manila Water has East La Mesa Treatment Plant located in the Payatas. The water treatment plant provides water to the Rizal province.

Sports
Payatas is still a very poor area and many foundations operate in Payatas to help improve the opportunities of residents. This includes, notably, the Fairplay For All Foundation. Fairplay run an Alternative Learning Center, a Sports Center, and a Cafe to holistically develop the community through social enterprise, safe spaces, and quality education. Each program is run in part by local residents. Several of the football players have also represented the country in the National Youth Team and for Team Philippines in the Street Child World Cup. Overall, Payatas Football Club has won more than 40 trophies between them.

Government
The seat of government of Payatas is located along Bulacan Street

See also
The Woman in the Septic Tank, a film set at Tondo dumpsite
Bangkang papel boys
 Bantar Gebang

Further reading
Thoughts of Maria, a novel by Gregory Heath featuring a family living on the Payatas Dump

References

Quezon City
Barangays of Quezon City
Barangays of Metro Manila
Slums in the Philippines
Squatting in the Philippines